Richard E. Wigley (October 23, 1918 – April 22, 1998) was an American politician and farmer.

Wigley was born in Judson Township, Blue Earth County, Minnesota. He graduated from the Mankato High School, in Mankato, Minnesota and went to the University of Minnesota School of Agriculture in Saint Paul, Minnesota. Wigley lived with his wife and family on a grain farm in Lake Crystal, Minnesota. Wigley served on the Blue Earth County Commission and the Lake Crystal School Board. He also served on the Blue Earth County Sherriff's Civil Service Commission and was the chair. Wigley served in the Minnesota House of Representatives from 1971 to 1984. Wigley died suddenly while he was on his tractor at his farm in Crystal Lake, Minnesota.

References

1918 births
1998 deaths
People from Blue Earth County, Minnesota
University of Minnesota alumni
Farmers from Minnesota
County commissioners in Minnesota
School board members in Minnesota
Members of the Minnesota House of Representatives